Route 41, known as  in Icelandic, is a highway in southwest Iceland, running along the northern shore of Reykjanes Peninsula from Keflavík Airport to the Capital Region.

Previously, much of the road was called  but the name is now given to route 424 that runs from Reykjanesbraut through outer Njarðvík and Keflavík. The current road is mostly dual and controlled-access. In addition to being the main road between Reykjavík and Keflavík Airport, it serves as a major traffic artery in the eastern and southern suburbs of the Capital Region. The road was finished in 1912 and was paved in 1965. 2003 saw the start of construction to upgrade the non-urban part to a four-lane road, being completed by October 2008.

Sections
Therefore, the stretch of Sæbraut east of Kringlumýrarbraut is marked as number 41.

References

Roads in Iceland
Keflavík